Trachelipus sarmaticus is a species of woodlouse in the genus Trachelipus belonging to the family Trachelipodidae that can be found in Ukraine.

References

Trachelipodidae
Woodlice of Europe
Crustaceans described in 1976